Temple Hauptfleisch is a South African playwright and academic, a professor emeritus of drama at Stellenbosch University.

Haupfleisch did his undergraduate studies at the University of the Orange Free State, graduating in 1966, and then went on to graduate studies at the University of South Africa, earning a master's degree in 1972 and a doctorate in 1978. At Stellenbosch, he chaired the drama department from 1995 to 2005. He is a co-founder (in 1987) and editor-in-chief of the South African Theatre Journal.

He is the author of the book Theatre and Society in South Africa: Reflections in a Fractured Mirror (Pretoria: J. L. van Schaik, 1997).

References 

Year of birth missing (living people)
Living people
University of the Free State alumni
University of South Africa alumni
Academic staff of Stellenbosch University
Theatrologists
South African dramatists and playwrights